Anyarku Praveshanamilla is a 2016 Malayalam language family comedy thriller film directed by V.S Jayakrishna and produced by Dhanesh Prabha Kakkad and Sajesh Nair under the banner DD entertainment and Grammy entertainment. The film features Tini Tom, Suraj Venjaramoodu, Idavela Babu, Sunil Sugatha in the lead roles. The film is expected to be released in June 2016.

This Movie explains the critical issues, when friends and outsiders are given undue importance and involvement in a family’s personal space. Every issue is shared meaningfully and with humor touch throughout this film. Title “Anyarku Praveshanamilla” is thus given appropriately to safeguard family’s personal space

Synopsis
Priyadarshan is a dubbing artist for TV serials and Ad-Films. He married Anjana for four years. They were concerned about not having a child. To overcome that, they socialised without realizing where to control and restrict their friends in their personal family space. Priyadarshan and Anjana are such couple who openly speaks their issues each other and resolve the same. Meera and Valanja Vazhi Sinjo are their intimate friends during college time. It was a surprise for Priyadarshan and Anjana to meet their old friends again after many years. Gradually these old friends started visiting the couple very frequently in their apartment. In one of their neighboring flats stay Chacko, David, and Kaimal. They lead a lavish life. Priyadarshan befriends them. Meanwhile, Anjana smells something fishy about Priyadarshan's behavior. The resulting incidents are narrated in ‘Anyarku Praveshanamilla’ through suspense comedy track. The moral is friends and outsiders should not be overly involved in one family’s personal space.

Cast

 Tini Tom as Priyadarshan
 Suraj Venjaramoodu as Valanja Vazhi Sinjo 
 Sreejith Ravi as Black Mani 
 Idavela Babu as Chako
 Chali Pala as Kaimal
 Sunil Sukhada as David
 Bijukuttan as Shefi
 Aditi Rai as Anjana (Priyadarshan's Wife)
 Ponnamma Babu as Mary
 Jeena Riju as Meera 
 Shruti as Kavitha Nair 
 Kottayam Pradeep as Director Ittikandom
 Saji Surendran as himself
 Kalabhavan Rahman as Ratheesh
 Shreyani
 Master Koustubh
 Baby Adisha
Harisree Yousof as Priest

Production
The film is produced by Dhanesh Prabha Kakkad and Sajesh Nair under the banner of DD Entertainment & Grammy Entertainment. Cinematography was done by Rajesh Narayanan.
and music direction by VS Jayakrishna & Varun Raghav. Stills were done by Premlal.
.
.
.
.

The film was shot at various locations in Aluva, Ernakulam, Thodupuzha, Vagamon.

Music

There are two songs in this movie. Title song is composed by Varun Raghav and sung by Jassie Gift. Second song is the highlight of this movie. This is a Hindi song which takes the audience back to the beauty of the 1970s. Highlight of this song is such that, this was written by the renowned Film director Major Ravi and sung and acted by actor Tini Tom himself. Another highlight is that, this song is composed by director V.S Jayakrishna himself.

Release
The film was initially planned for a release in February 2016. But the post-production works did not completed, which postponed the film to open during the Hindu festival of Vishu in April 2016. But the release date was again pushed to May as the post-production work will only complete on May first Week. Anyarku Praveshanamilla is finally scheduled to release on 17 June 2016.

Reception

The movie had a limited release and was a disaster at box office.

References

External links
 
 Official Facebook Page

2016 films
Indian comedy films
2010s Malayalam-language films